The Keram languages of New Guinea are part of the Ramu family. They are the Mongol–Langam languages and a pair of languages sometimes thought to belong to the Grass family. (See Grass languages for the history of classification.)

Foley (2018) classifies most of them in the Grass branch of the Ramu family, 
while Usher classifies them as coordinate with the Ramu family, leaving a reduced number of languages in the Grass branch.

They are named for the Keram River.

Languages
East Keram River
Ambakich (Aion)
Ap Ma (Kambot)
West Keram River (Mongol–Langam)
Mwakai (Mongol)
Pondi (Langam)
Ulwa (Yaul)

Pronouns
Usher (2020) reconstructs the pronouns of East Keram and West Keram as follows:

{| 
! !!colspan=2|East Keram !!colspan=2|West Keram 
|-
! !!sg!!pl!!sg!!pl
|-
! 1 
|*ni || *anɨ || *ni || *an
|-
!2
| *[o/u] || *[o/u]nɨ || *u || *un
|-
!3
| *ma || *aLɨ || *mɨ, *ma- || *ndɨ
|}

See also
Grass languages
Keram River

References

External links 
 Timothy Usher, New Guinea World, Proto–East Keram River
(ibid)  Proto–West Keram River

 
Ramu languages